Salvation is a two-disc live album by stand-up comedian and satirist Bill Hicks posthumously released in 2005 on Rykodisc. It was recorded at the Oxford Playhouse, and is an unabridged version of Shock and Awe.

Track listing

Disc one
"Intro" (0:55)
"Ding Dong" (10:21)
"Puppet People" (13:13)
"Kennedy and the Warren Commission" (3:10)
"Smoking" (3:44)
"Polls" (3:59)
"Dick Jokes" (7:11)
"News/Movies/Religion" (13:57)

Disc two
"Religion/Drugs" (23:51)
"Film" (3:03)
"Kids" (5:00)
"Fries" (2:54)
"Backed Up" (12:20)
"Sleep and the Message" (10:49)

References

Bill Hicks albums
Live albums published posthumously
2005 live albums
Rykodisc live albums
2000s comedy albums
Live comedy albums
Spoken word albums by American artists
Stand-up comedy albums